William, Prince of Hohenzollern (7 March 1864 in Schloss Benrath, near Düsseldorf – 22 October 1927 in Sigmaringen) was the eldest son of Leopold, Prince of Hohenzollern and Infanta Antónia of Portugal.

William was an older brother of Ferdinand of Romania. His first cousins included (among others) Carlos I of Portugal, Albert I of Belgium, Frederick Augustus III of Saxony, and Princess Maria Josepha of Saxony.

Between 1880 and 1886, William was heir presumptive to the Romanian throne. On 20 December 1886, he renounced his rights to the throne in favor of his brother Ferdinand.

Family
 
 
On 27 June 1889, William married Princess Maria Teresa of Bourbon-Two Sicilies. Her parents were Prince Louis, Count of Trani and Mathilde Ludovika, Duchess in Bavaria. Louis was the eldest son of Ferdinand II of the Two Sicilies and his second wife Archduchess Maria Theresa of Austria. Mathilde was the fourth daughter of Maximilian, Duke in Bavaria and Princess Ludovika of Bavaria. William and Maria Teresa had three children:

Augusta Victoria of Hohenzollern (19 August 1890 – 29 August 1966). Married first Manuel II of Portugal and secondly Robert, Count Douglas.
Prince Frederick Victor of Hohenzollern (30 August 1891 – 6 February 1965). Married Princess Margarete Karola of Saxony. She was a daughter of Frederick Augustus III of Saxony and Archduchess Luise, Princess of Tuscany.
Prince Francis Joseph of Hohenzollern, adopted the title Prince of Hohenzollern-Emden (30 August 1891 – 3 April 1964).  He married Princess Maria Alix of Saxony, also a daughter of Frederick Augustus III of Saxony and Archduchess Luise, Princess of Tuscany.

William succeeded his father as Prince of Hohenzollern on 8 June 1905. Maria Teresa died on 1 May 1909. 

On 20 January 1915, Wilhelm married secondly Princess Adelgunde of Bavaria. She was a daughter of Ludwig III of Bavaria and Maria Theresia of Austria-Este. There were no children from this marriage.

William's title was effectively abolished with the collapse of the German Empire. He continued to use his princely surname, which was permitted by the constitution.

Romanian succession 
On 22 November 1880, William's father, Prince Leopold, renounced his rights to the succession of the principality of Romania in favour of his sons.

Having become familiar with the situation there, the 22-year-old William renounced all rights to the succession of the kingdom (since 1881) of Romania by a letter in French dated on 20 December 1886.

In 1914, upon the death of king Carol I of Romania, William's next brother Ferdinand became king.

Honours and awards
German orders and decorations

Foreign orders and decorations

Ancestry

References

"The Book of Kings: A Royal Genealogy" by C. Arnold McNaughton.

Princes of Hohenzollern
Members of the Prussian House of Lords
Nobility from Düsseldorf
People from the Rhine Province
Generals of Infantry (Prussia)
German landowners
1864 births
1927 deaths
Recipients of the Iron Cross, 1st class
Grand Crosses of the Order of the Crown (Romania)
Grand Crosses of the Order of the Star of Romania
Knights of the Golden Fleece of Austria
Grand Crosses of the Order of Saint Stephen of Hungary
Knights of the Holy Sepulchre
2
2
Grand Crosses of Military Merit
Military personnel from North Rhine-Westphalia
Non-inheriting heirs presumptive